The Space Dream (Chinese: 飛天) is a 2011 Chinese film directed by Wang Jia and Shen Dong.

Cast
Liu Zhibing as Zhang Tiancong
Jiang Ruijia as Siyu
Niu Li as Qu Dan
Wu Gang as Li Dawei
Zhao Xiaoming as Zhou Guanxiong

References

External links

2011 films
Chinese drama films
2010s Mandarin-language films